North Manchester General Hospital (NMGH) is a large NHS hospital in Crumpsall, North Manchester, England. It is operated by Manchester University NHS Foundation Trust. There is an accident and emergency unit, together with a maternity unit, high dependency unit and a mental health wing.  A long-awaited plan to rebuild the hospital was announced publicly by Boris Johnson in the 2019 General Election campaign, and in November 2020 a £54 million funding bid for improvement works was made by the Trust, the city council and Manchester Health and Care Commissioning.

History

Introduction
This extensive hospital site originally housed three separate hospitals: Crumpsall Hospital, Delaunays Hospital and Springfield Hospital. The three amalgamated to create North Manchester General Hospital in 1977.

Crumpsall Hospital

Crumpsall Hospital was built as an infirmary for the Manchester Union Workhouse and opened in 1876.

In 1914 the hospital was a receiving station firstly for 500 casualties from Belgium. By 1924 there was an X-ray department, ear, eye and dental departments and a chiropody room.  There were then 4 or 5 resident medical officers, who usually stayed for about 2 years, rotating through the different specialities. In 1927 a new dispensary and a separate block for operating theatres, X-ray, dental and recovery rooms was built.

The Infirmary had 1,440 beds in 1928 with a further 600 in the attached mental department. The patients included both chronic and acute cases and both acute cases and the work of the obstetric and gynaecological department had been increasing. The hospital had a bacteriological and pathological laboratory and was a registered training school for nurses both in general medical and surgical work and in midwifery.  in 1929 it became a municipal hospital.

In 1948 the hospital joined the National Health Service. In 1951 a nurses sick bay, a premature babies unit and a new Physiotherapy department were opened. In 1952 the hospital was recognised by Manchester University for clinical teaching and some of the senior medical staff were appointed honorary lecturers.

Delaunays Hospital
Delaunays Hospital was designed by Thomas Worthington as a workhouse and hospital for the Prestwich Board of Guardians and opened in 1869. The Prestwich Workhouse and Hospital was absorbed into the Manchester Union Workhouse in 1915.

Springfield Hospital

Springfield Hospital had its origins in the new Manchester Union Workhouse, designed by Mills and Murgatroyd, and completed in 1853. The workhouse developed into a hospital for the mentally ill known as the Crumpsall Institution. It was renamed Park House in 1939 and became Springfield Hospital on joining the National Health Service in 1948.

Post-merger
Crumpsall Hospital, Delaunays Hospital and Springfield Hospital amalgamated to create North Manchester General Hospital in 1977. After the Victoria Memorial Jewish Hospital closed in 1992, the Jewish Victoria Wing was established at the North Manchester General Hospital. Similarly, after the Northern Hospital for Women and Children closed in 1994, women's and children's services were centralised at the North Manchester General Hospital and a new women's and children's block opened in June 2010. Plans to build a new intermediate care centre were announced in 2019.

Management from 2020 
Since April 2020, the hospital is managed by Manchester University NHS Foundation Trust under a management agreement with Northern Care Alliance NHS Group. The NHS Group was formed in 2017 to combine Pennine Acute Hospitals NHS Trust – which previously operated the hospital – with Salford Royal NHS Foundation Trust.

See also
 Healthcare in Greater Manchester
 List of hospitals in England

Notes

References

External links
Official site

NHS hospitals in England
Hospitals in Manchester
Municipal hospitals
Poor law infirmaries